The yunluo (simplified: 云锣; traditional: 雲鑼 pinyin: yúnluó, ; literally "cloud gongs" or "cloud of gongs"), is a traditional Chinese musical instrument. It is made up of a set of gongs of varying sizes held within a frame. It was also called yún'áo (雲璈) in ancient times.

Traditional yunluo

The yunluo is a set of usually ten small tuned gongs mounted in a wooden frame, with each gong being about 9-12 cm in diameter, and the height of the frame being about 52 cm. The yunluo'''s gongs are generally of equal diameter but different thicknesses; the thicker gongs produce a higher pitch. It is often used in wind and percussion ensembles in northern China. Old drawings also depict a smaller yunluo with just five gongs, which was held by a handle by one hand and played with the other.

The traditional yunluo is sometimes referred to as the shimianluo (十面锣; literally "ten faced gongs") to distinguish it from the modern redesigned yunluo.

Modern yunluo

A modernised yunluo has been developed from the traditional yunluo for use in the large modern Chinese orchestra. It is much larger with 29 or more gongs of different diameters. Its height may be over 2m including its two legs on which it stands on the floor (the frame itself is about half its height); its width is about 1.4 m or wider.

In other countries
A very similar instrument called the ulla (hangul: 운라; hanja: 雲鑼 or 雲羅), which is derived from the yunluo, is used in the music of Korea. Ulla was introduced from the Qing Dynasty in the late Joseon Dynasty and was presumed to be used in some of the haengak (hangul: 행악; hanja: 行樂). Ten small round gongs made of copper are hung on a wooden frame and played by striking with a small wooden mallet.

The nhã nhạc music of Vietnam uses a similar instrument with three gongs, called the tam âm la (Sino-Vietnamese: 三音鑼).

See also
Traditional Chinese musical instruments
Music of China

References

External links
Photo and description of yunluo (the picture is of a traditional yunluo'')
Yunluo and shimianluo

Video
Video of an 18-gong yunluo, from The Musical Instruments E-book

Gongs
Chinese musical instruments